Dragan Gjorgiev (born 16 December 1990 in Radoviš) is a Macedonian footballer who currently plays for Swiss lower league side FC Rotkreuz. He was also a member of the Macedonian Under-21 team. His last name is often mistaken for Georgiev.

Club career
Gjorgiev began his career with FK Plačkovica from Radoviš and latter at the age of 15 he joined FK Turnovo. On 19 July 2010, he left FK Turnovo and joined Bundesliga club 1. FSV Mainz 05 on loan for one season.  Mainz liked his talent but felt he wasn't ready for the Bundesliga so he was loaned for one season in order to get match practice to 2. Bundesliga team SC Paderborn 07 on 31 August 2010.

Gjorgiev made his debut for Paderborn on 24 September 2010 when he came off the bench in the 62nd minute in a 2–0 loss away to Alemannia Aachen.  That was his only league game in Germany as during the summer of 2011, Georgiev returned to Turnovo. In June 2012, he signed for league champions FK Vardar. He later moved to Switzerland where he plays alongside compatriot Cvetan Churlinov.

International career
He made his senior debut for Macedonia in a September 2012 FIFA World Cup qualification match away against Croatia and has earned a total of 3 caps, scoring no goals. His final international was a December 2012 friendly match against Poland.

References

External links
 
 Profile at MacedonianFootball
 

1990 births
Living people
People from Radoviš
Association football wingers
Macedonian footballers
North Macedonia youth international footballers
North Macedonia under-21 international footballers
North Macedonia international footballers
FK Horizont Turnovo players
1. FSV Mainz 05 players
SC Paderborn 07 players
FK Vardar players
FC Wangen bei Olten players
Macedonian First Football League players
2. Bundesliga players
Macedonian expatriate footballers
Expatriate footballers in Germany
Macedonian expatriate sportspeople in Germany
Expatriate footballers in Switzerland
Macedonian expatriate sportspeople in Switzerland